Go All the Way may refer to:

 "Go All the Way" (song), a 1972 song by the Raspberries
 Go All the Way (The Isley Brothers album), 1980, or the title song
 Go All the Way (China album), 1991
 Go All the Way, a 1981 album by Kojo
 Goin' All the Way! (1981)  film
 Going All the Way (1997)  film

See also
 Let's Go All the Way (disambiguation)